The national symbols of the Czech Republic are flags, heraldry, cultural expressions and other symbols that represent the Czech Republic, Czech people and their history, culture and nationhood. There are six official symbols which are declared in the Constitution of the Czech Republic. However many other historical, cultural and geographical symbols of the Czech republic and Czech people do exist.

Constitutional symbols 
Article 14 of the Constitution of the Czech Republic lists national symbols: the coat of arms, the official colours (including white, red and blue, also Pan-Slavic colors), the national flag, the flag of the president, the official seal and the national anthem. Act No. 3/1993 refers to the national symbols and their usage.

Symbols of Czech lands 

The Czech republic includes three historical regions of Bohemia, Moravia and Czech Silesia. Each region has got its own symbols.

Flags

Coats of arms

Unofficial symbols

Landmarks

People

Food

Flora

Arts and crafts

Folk costumes

Dance and music

References

External links 

 Symbols of the Czech Republic